Villages in Panipat district

Patti Kalyana(Royal Pattikalyana) is a village in the Panipat district of Haryana, India. It is located along National Highway 44.
 
Patti Kalyana is part of the 24 Chhokkar clan villages. This village has its origin from nearby village Chulkana. Most of the villagers are engaged in agriculture. However some are in the government and private sector. The village has brigadier, IAS, IPS and judiciary.

Politicians from Patti Kalyana include Ch. katar Singh Chhokkar(ex Finance Minister Haryana Govt), Sanjay Chhokkar, BJP leader and state president Haryana , Tejpal chhoker ex - sarpanch  patti kalyana. Professor Jagdeep S. Chhokar founding member of ADR (Association for democratic Reforms) also hails from here.  Just like other Gurjar villages people of this village also participated in 1824 revoult (Gurjar Gadhar), 1857 revolt. People of this village believes in Hardworking with broad mind thinking. There are good Valmiki's samaj people living in the Village.
There is the Samadhi of Baba Shiv Shah Ji, Baba Neki Shah Ji and Satguru Kawal Shah Brahamchari Ji And a historical temple of Bhagwan Balmiki who is the Guru (God) of Balmiki Religion. The temple was made in 1927 and the Balmiki's from all around the world visit to celebrate the Jhanda Parv on the first Friday of Aashadh maas.